.detuned is a demoscene project by the German demogroup .theprodukkt (also known as Farbrausch), released on the PlayStation 3. It is the second demo released on the PlayStation 3 after Linger in Shadows.

.detuned features a man sitting in a chair surrounded by a psychedelic environment. The player can switch into various modes, and using the trigger buttons and right analogue stick, apply certain effects on the man, which e.g. make his head shrink or apply a post-processing filter on the visuals and music. The player is also able to load their own music in.

Reception

The game received "generally unfavorable reviews" according to the review aggregation website Metacritic. IGN cited the lack of lasting appeal as the biggest problem about .detuned, saying that "selling for $2.99 in the US PlayStation Store, that's about a dollar per minute of entertainment".

References

External links
.detuned on playstation store(page snapshot by wayback machine in 2010 02 01)

2009 video games
Demos
PlayStation 3 games
PlayStation 3-only games
PlayStation Network games
Sony Interactive Entertainment games
Video games developed in Germany